Veale Township is one of ten townships in Daviess County, Indiana. As of the 2010 census, its population was 1,095 and it contained 449 housing units.

History
Veale Township was organized on 12 May 1817 at the first meeting of the Daviess County Commissioners. and named for James Veale; one of the township's first residents, Veale had settled there in 1807 or 1808.  In the county's early history, Veale Township was an industrial leader: within its boundaries were the first sawmill and the first distillery in Daviess County.

Geography
Horseshoe Pond and Jackson Pond are in this township.

Unincorporated towns
 Cumback
 Sandy Hook
(This list is based on USGS data and may include former settlements.)

Adjacent townships
 Washington Township (north)
 Harrison Township (east)
 Jefferson Township, Pike County (southeast)
 Washington Township, Pike County (southwest)
 Harrison Township, Knox County (west)

Major highways

Cemeteries
The township contains one cemetery, Bethel.

References
 United States Census Bureau cartographic boundary files
 U.S. Board on Geographic Names

External links
 Indiana Township Association
 United Township Association of Indiana

Townships in Daviess County, Indiana
Townships in Indiana
1817 establishments in Indiana
Populated places established in 1817